Waltari is the eponymous debut album by Finnish heavy metal band Waltari. It was released in 1988 by Fucking DUCK 1 label. This is the only album released by Waltari as a trio band, in the original line-up.

Track listing

 Living in the Cellars      
 F.U.C.K. Rap      
 Sillanpää      
 Having Fun      
 Pala Leipää       
 Tuttu Juttu

Credits

 Kartsy Hatakka (vocals, bass, keyboards)
 Jariot Lehtinen (guitar)
 Sale Suomalainen (drums)

References

1988 debut albums
Waltari albums